Ahgykson Island, formerly Harwood Island, is a small island that lies off the coast of Powell River, BC. The island is an indian reserve and part of the traditional territory of the Sliammon First Nation.

Etymology
The island has long been called "Ahgykson" by the Tla'amin people who have lived in this territory for at least 8,000 years. In 1798, Captain Vancouver renamed it in his records as "Harwood Island." The traditional Tla'amin name was officially reinstated on 5 April 2016.

Geography
Ahgykson Island is the northernmost island of the Northern Gulf Islands.

See also
Savary Island

References

External links

Islands of British Columbia
South Coast of British Columbia
Uninhabited islands of British Columbia